Aethes persica is a species of moth of the family Tortricidae. It was described by Razowski in 1963. It is found in Fars Province, Iran.

References

persica
Endemic fauna of Iran
Moths described in 1963
Taxa named by Józef Razowski
Moths of Asia